Opitutus terrae is an obligately anaerobic (cannot grow in the presence of oxygen) bacterium first isolated from rice paddy soil, hence its epithet. It is coccus-shaped and is motile by means of a flagellum. Its type strain is PB90-1T (= DSM 11246T). Its genome has been sequenced.

References

Further reading

External links
 LPSN
 Type strain of Opitutus terrae at BacDive -  the Bacterial Diversity Metadatabase
 microbewiki

Verrucomicrobiota
Medically important anaerobes
Bacteria described in 2001